Warren Mok is a Hong Kong-based Macau operatic tenor who has performed many leading roles since his European debut in 1987 at the Deutsche Oper Berlin. He has a repertoire of 50 operatic roles, including Calaf in Turandot, Cavaradossi in Tosca, Don José in Carmen, and Radames in Aida. He has recorded many solo albums and opera CDs, including Il trovatore, Simon Boccanegra, Roma, Robert le diable and Les Huguenots. He has also appeared regularly on television and radio programs worldwide.

Mok is the artistic director of the Macau International Music Festival and founder and artistic director of Opera Hong Kong. He is a graduate of the University of Hawaiʻi and holds a Master of Music degree from Manhattan School of Music.

Mok tested positive for COVID-19 in March 2020 in Bangkok and again in April in Hong Kong. He was discharged after 38 days in hospital in Bangkok and Hong Kong.

References

External links
Official Homepage

Year of birth missing (living people)
Living people
20th-century Chinese male opera singers
21st-century Chinese male opera singers
Hong Kong tenors
Chinese operatic tenors
Macau people
University of Hawaiʻi at Mānoa alumni
Manhattan School of Music alumni
Members of the Election Committee of Hong Kong, 2017–2021
Members of the Election Committee of Hong Kong, 2021–2026
Members of the 14th Chinese People's Political Consultative Conference